The long 18th century is a phrase used by many British historians to cover a more natural historical period than the simple use of the standard calendar definition. They expand the century to include larger British and Western European historical movements, with their subsequent "long" 18th century typically running from the Glorious Revolution and the beginning of the Nine Years' War in 1688 to the end of the Napoleonic Wars in 1815. Other definitions, perhaps those with a more social or global interest, extend the period further to, for example, from the Stuart Restoration in 1660 to the end of the Georgian era. Possibly the earliest proponent of the long eighteenth century was Sir John Robert Seeley, who in 1883 defined the eighteenth century as "the period which begins with the Revolution of 1688 and ends with the peace of 1815".

See also
 Long 19th century
 Second Hundred Years' War
 Short 20th century

References 

18th century
Historical eras
1680s
1690s
1800s
1810s
Periodization